The 2002 DFB-Pokal Final decided the winner of the 2001–02 DFB-Pokal, the 59th season of Germany's premier knockout football cup competition. It was played on 11 May 2002 at the Olympiastadion in Berlin. Schalke 04 won the match 4–2 against Bayer Leverkusen to claim their 4th cup title.

Route to the final
The DFB-Pokal began with 64 teams in a single-elimination knockout cup competition. There were a total of five rounds leading up to the final. Teams were drawn against each other, and the winner after 90 minutes would advance. If still tied, 30 minutes of extra time was played. If the score was still level, a penalty shoot-out was used to determine the winner.

Note: In all results below, the score of the finalist is given first (H: home; A: away).

Match

Details

Notes

References

External links
 Match report at kicker.de 
 Match report at WorldFootball.net
 Match report at Fussballdaten.de 

FC Schalke 04 matches
Bayer 04 Leverkusen matches
2001–02 in German football cups
2002
May 2002 sports events in Europe
2002 in Berlin
Football competitions in Berlin